Manghai is a town in Mangshi, Yunnan, China. It is surrounded by Zhefang Town on the northwest, Mengga Town and Dongshan Township on the east, and Myanmar on the south.

Administrative division
As of December 2015, the town is divided into 3 villages: 
 Manghai 
 Lüyin 
 Lainan

Geography

Climate

Economy
The economy is supported primarily by farming, ranching and frontier trade. The traditional industries are rice, tea, sugarcane, animal husbandry and tsao-ko. The emerging industries are walnut, coffee, macadamia nut and bamboo industry.

Education
 Manghai Nine-year School

Transportation
The National Highway G320 passes across the town.

References

Divisions of Mangshi
Towns of Yunnan
China–Myanmar border crossings